The Dutch Wikipedia is the Dutch-language edition of the free online encyclopedia, Wikipedia. It was founded on 19 June 2001. 

It was the fourth Wikipedia edition to exceed one million articles, after the English, German, and French editions. In April 2016, 1154 active editors made at least five edits in that month.

Dutch is consistently the most popular Wikipedia in the Netherlands. In Belgium, sometimes it is the most popular as well; in Suriname however, the only Dutch-speaking country outside Europe, it is second after English. In Belgium, the most popular Wikipedia is usually French.

In Curaçao and Aruba, as well in Caribbean Netherlands, it has a presence, but has fewer pageviews than English there.

History

The Dutch Wikipedia was started on 19 June 2001, and reached 100,000 articles on 14 October 2005. It briefly surpassed the Polish Wikipedia as the sixth-largest edition of Wikipedia, but then fell back to the eighth position. On 1 March 2006, it overtook the Swedish and Italian editions in one day to rise back to the sixth position. The edition's 500,000th article was created on 30 November 2008. In a 2006 Multiscope research study, the Dutch Wikipedia was rated the third-best Dutch-language website, after Google and Gmail, with a score of 8.1.

The Dutch language Wikipedia has the largest ratio of Wikipedia pages per native speaker of all of the top 10 largest Wikipedia editions. Its rate of daily article creations spiked in March 2006, rapidly growing to an average of 1,000 a day in early May 2006. After this number was reached, growth dropped to an average of only about 250 a day, comparable to the averages around December 2005. Since then, there have been more article-creation surges, one of the largest peaking at 2,000 new articles per day in September 2007, but the growth rate has always returned to the lowest average of around 250.

In 2008, Dutch businessman Bob Sijthoff attempted to sue "the Vereniging Wikimedia Nederland" and "the Stichting Wikimedia Nederland" to force the removal of his Dutch Wikipedia article, which he stated contained "false and abusive" information. On 10 December 2008, the court rejected his request. The judge ruled that he had sued the wrong entity and that legal responsibility for the content of the articles would not lie in the Netherlands, but with the American Wikimedia Foundation.

Internet bots
The majority of articles in Dutch Wikipedia (59%) were created by internet bots. In October 2011, several bots created 80,000 articles (then equivalent to 10% of the entire edition's article count) in only 11 days.

The Dutch Wikipedia's one-millionth article was created in December 2011, after another surge of bot activity saw 100,000 added articles in only 10 days. In late March 2013, the Dutch Wikipedia surpassed the French Wikipedia to become the third-largest edition of Wikipedia. In June 2013, it overtook the German Wikipedia to become the second-largest Wikipedia edition.

Quality

Depth
The depth or editing depth of Wikipedia is a rough indicator of the encyclopedia's collaborative quality, showing how frequently its articles are updated. The depth is measured by taking the average number of edits per article multiplied by the extent in which articles are supported by discussion (among other things, talk pages). Among the nine language editions with one million articles, the Dutch, Swedish, and Polish Wikipedias in that order have depth parameters much lower than the other six. , for the English version the article depth is 666, for the German 88, for the French 153, for the Spanish 160, for the Dutch only 18.

Bytes per article

Compared to most other Wikipedia editions with a similar number of articles, articles on the Dutch Wikipedia have less content with an average of 1,598 bytes per article. This is roughly 40% of that of the French, German, Italian, Russian, and Spanish editions (3,986–4,277 bytes/article ).

Culture 
Dutch Wikipedians responding to a Wikimedia survey described the atmosphere on the Dutch Wikipedia as quarrelsome and distrustful, with ego and stubbornness named as the premier causes of conflict. There is a small hardcore group of users in effective control. An ability to argue is deemed indispensable to be heard. New users are discouraged by moderators from joining discussions in the Dutch equivalent of the Village pump.

Article growth

See also
 Dutch Low Saxon Wikipedia

References

Further reading
de Smits, Ap. "Dat zoeken we op! Wikipedia vs. de Britannica en Encarta". Personal Computer Magazine . April 2008.

External links

  Dutch Wikipedia
  Dutch Wikipedia mobile version

Wikipedias by language
Wikipedias in Germanic languages
Internet properties established in 2001
Dutch encyclopedias
Dutch-language websites